Philip Osei (born 30 October 1990) is a Canadian sprinter specialising in the 400 metres. He represented his country at the 2016 World Indoor Championships

His personal bests in the event are 45.23 seconds outdoors (San José, CRC 2015) and 46.35 seconds indoors (New York 2016).

Competition record

References

1990 births
Living people
Athletes from Toronto
Commonwealth Games competitors for Canada
Athletes (track and field) at the 2014 Commonwealth Games
Pan American Games track and field athletes for Canada
Athletes (track and field) at the 2011 Pan American Games
Athletes (track and field) at the 2015 Pan American Games
Athletes (track and field) at the 2019 Pan American Games
Canadian male sprinters
Canadian Track and Field Championships winners